Arachnogyaritus saleuii is a species of beetle in the family Cerambycidae. It was described by Gouverneur and Vitali in 2016. It is known from Laos.

References

Gyaritini
Beetles described in 2016